The 2016 Formula V8 3.5 Series was a multi-event motor racing championship for open wheel, formula racing cars held across Europe. The championship featured drivers competing in Formula V8 3.5 formula race cars that conformed to the technical regulations for the championship. The 2016 season was the first Formula V8 3.5 season organised independently by RPM Racing, after it was announced that Renault Sport would withdraw its backing of the championship at the end of the previous season.

The title was won by Tom Dillmann who took two race victories across the season such as championship runner-up Louis Delétraz, with the latter becoming the best rookie of the year. By winning the second race in Barcelona which turned out to be the title decider, Dillmann managed to overtake Delétraz in the standings in order to win the championship by seven points, becoming the oldest series' world champion aged 27 years. Despite winning the most races of the season with five, Egor Orudzhev finished third in the standings due to inconsistent results in the form of several retirements. Fourth-placed driver Roy Nissany took three victories, amongst winning both races in Silverstone. Matthieu Vaxivière, Aurélien Panis, Matevos Isaakyan and Johnny Cecotto Jr. were the other drivers to achieve at least one win throughout the year.

Teams and drivers

Driver changes
Changed teams
 Tom Dillmann switched from Jagonya Ayam with Carlin to AVF.
 Yu Kanamaru moved from Pons Racing to newcomers Teo Martín Motorsport.
 Roy Nissany made his switch from Tech 1 Racing to Lotus.
 Aurélien Panis moved from Tech 1 Racing to Arden Motorsport.
 Matthieu Vaxivière switched from Lotus to SMP Racing.
 Beitske Visser, who raced for AVF for two consecutive seasons was set to join Pons Racing, but following their withdrawal from the series, she signed with Teo Martín Motorsport.

Entering/Re–Entering Formula V8 3.5
 2015 SMP F4 Championship runner-up Vladimir Atoev was set join the series with SMP Racing but due to health problems he was replaced by 2015 Eurocup Formula Renault 2.0 driver Matevos Isaakyan.
 2015 Euroformula Open champion Vitor Baptista will join the series with RP Motorsport.
 After competing for Pons Racing at the Nürburgring in 2015, GP2 Series driver René Binder will join the series full-time with Lotus.
 Johnny Cecotto Jr., who raced at GP2 Series in 2015 moved to the series with RP Motorsport.
 Gentleman driver Giuseppe Cipriani joins the series with Durango Racing Team.
 After competing for Comtec Racing at the Red Bull Ring in 2015, Louis Delétraz, the 2015 Formula Renault 2.0 NEC champion, will enter the series full-time with Fortec Motorsports.
 Pietro Fittipaldi, who raced in the 2015 European Formula 3 Championship, will continue his collaboration with Fortec Motorsports into the series.

Leaving Formula V8 3.5
 Philo Paz Armand, Sean Gelael, Gustav Malja and Nicholas Latifi, who raced for Pons Racing, Jagonya Ayam with Carlin, Strakka Racing and Arden Motorsport respectively, will join the 2016 GP2 Series with Trident, Campos Racing, Rapax, and DAMS. 2015 Formula Renault 3.5 Series champion Oliver Rowland, who raced part-time in GP2 in 2015, will join the series full-time with MP Motorsport.
 Jazeman Jaafar, who finished eighth for Fortec Motorsports in 2015, will race in both the Blancpain Sprint Series and Blancpain Endurance Series with HTP Motorsport.
 Roberto Merhi, who contested a part-season with Pons Racing, will join the 2016 FIA World Endurance Championship with Manor in the LMP2 category.
 DAMS drivers Dean Stoneman and Nyck de Vries will leave the series to compete in the 2016 Indy Lights and 2016 GP3 Series with Andretti Autosport and ART Grand Prix respectively.
 Nikita Zlobin, who took part in the final two rounds of 2015 with Pons Racing, will join Euroformula Open with Teo Martín Motorsport.
Mid-season changes
 Prior to the round at Le Castellet, Johnny Cecotto Jr. was replaced by Artur Janosz at RP Motorsport.
 Prior to the round at the Red Bull Ring, Marco Bonanomi filled the seat left empty by Janosz at RP Motorsport.
 Bonanomi was replaced by William Buller at RP Motorsport at Monza.
 Buller was replaced by Jack Aitken at RP Motorsport at the final two rounds at Jerez and Barcelona.

Team changes
 After five seasons in the Formula Renault 3.5 Series (the 2005 season and from 2012 to 2015), DAMS will leave the championship to join the GP3 Series. The team's entry will be taken by International GT Open team Teo Martín Motorsport.
 Swiss team Spirit of Race will make its debut in 2016, taking the slot vacated by International Draco Racing. It was announced in February 2016 that the team would be operated by the SMP Racing concern under a Russian license.
 Euroformula Open team RP Motorsport will make their series debut in 2016.
 Carlin announced their withdrawal from the championship in March 2016 in order to concentrate on their GP2 Series activities.
 Durango Racing Team will make their series debut in 2016, replacing Tech 1 Racing.
 Pons Racing withdrew from the championship to focus on their Moto2 commitments.

Race calendar
The provisional calendar for the 2016 season was announced on 17 October 2015, at the final round of the 2015 season. The championship returns to Paul Ricard, Monza and Barcelona. Rounds previously held at Monaco, Nürburgring and Le Mans Bugatti were removed from the schedule.

On 8 March 2016, it was announced that due to operational reasons, the final two rounds of the season would switch dates. The event at Jerez will become the penultimate round with the Circuit de Barcelona-Catalunya hosting the final round.

Results

Championship standings
Points system
Points were awarded to the top 10 classified finishers.

Drivers' Championship

Teams' Championship

References

External links

World Series Formula V8 3.5 seasons
Formula V8 3.5
Formula V8 3.5
Formula V8 3.5